Agathia rubrilineata is a species of moth of the family Geometridae first described by William Warren in 1896. It is found in Borneo, Sumatra; Siberut (ssp. klossi); Java (ssp. aequisecta).

External links

Geometrinae
Moths of Asia